A high Earth orbit is a geocentric orbit with an altitude entirely above that of a geosynchronous orbit. The orbital periods of such orbits are greater than 24 hours, therefore satellites in such orbits have an apparent retrograde motion – that is, even if they are in a prograde orbit (0° ≤ inclination < 90°), their orbital velocity is lower than Earth's rotational speed, causing their ground track to move westward on Earth's surface.

Examples of satellites in high Earth orbit

See also
Ukrainian Optical Facilities for Near-Earth Space Surveillance Network

References

Earth orbits